William Sergrove (1746–1796) was a Clergyman and Master of Pembroke College, Oxford.

Education
He was educated at John Roysse's Free School in Abingdon, (now Abingdon School) and St Paul's School, London. He earned a B.A (1766) and M.A (1769) at Pembroke. B.D. (1778) and Doctor of Divinity (D.D.) 1789.

Career
Sergrove was Master of Pembroke from 1789-1796.

The close relationship between Abingdon School and Pembroke College resulted in seven Old Abingdonians being appointed as consecutive masters at Pembroke between 1710 and 1843.  They were Colwell Brickenden 1709-1714; Matthew Panting, 1714-1738; John Ratcliffe, 1738-1775; William Adams, 1775-1789; Sergrove 1789-1796; John Smyth, 1796-1809 and George William Hall, 1809-1843.

He was rector of St. Aldates's, Oxford (1774-1789), canon of Gloucester (1789), vicar of Penmark and Llantwit Major (1795-1796).

See also
 List of Old Abingdonians
 List of Pembroke College, Oxford, people

References

1746 births
1796 deaths
Masters of Pembroke College, Oxford
People educated at Abingdon School